Michel Suffran (1 November 1931 – 5 July 2018) was a French novelist(formerly a doctor). He won the Prix Durchon-Louvet from the Académie française for La nuit de Dieu in 1987.

References

1931 births
2018 deaths
Writers from Bordeaux
French male novelists